is a Japanese retired professional wrestler better known by the ring name . She is best known for her work with the ARSION professional wrestling promotion, where she was also head trainer.

Professional wrestling career
Yoshida debuted for All Japan Women's Pro-Wrestling (AJW or Zenjo) on October 10, 1988 at Tokyo's Korakuen Hall in a match against Keiko Waki. Before her neck injury in late 1992, which would cause her to miss two years of ring time, Yoshida was easily one of the best young stars in AJW, often showcasing Lucha Libre inspired aerial maneuvers to go along with her matwork skills.

In 1997, she left AJW to join Aja Kong's Arsion promotion, becoming their head trainer. There she was repackaged as a technical wrestling master, and was pushed as a major star. She has been nicknamed ARSION no Shinjutsu, or "Arsion True Heart". Forgoing the high-flying techniques of her run in Zenjo, her style in Arsion was centered on mat wrestling and submission holds derived from shoot wrestling, along with more elaborate lucha-inspired submissions.

In June 2005, she launched Ibuki, a bi-monthly event series, with her intention to provide opportunities for young, up and coming wrestlers from different promotions to compete with each other and to challenge senior wrestlers like Yoshida herself. Ibuki has now gained high reputation among joshi puroresu fans in Japan.

In 2006, Yoshida was presented with the Cauliflower Alley Club's Future Legend Award, becoming only the second female after Cheerleader Melissa, to win this award.

Yoshida retired from professional wrestling on November 19, 2017, losing to her trainee Hiroyo Matsumoto in her final match.

Professional wrestling style and persona
Yoshida employed a submission-based style, based on her shoot wrestling training. Yoshida is the innovator of two finishing moves, an over-the-shoulder back-to-belly piledriver, which she calls the Air Raid Crash and a headscissors shoulder lock, which she has named the Spider Twist. Among her signature moves are the arm wrench inside cradle, a Cross armbar, sometimes proceeded by an Oklahoma roll, a lifting double underhook facebuster, a running big boot and a triangle choke. She uses "Fable" by Robert Miles as her theme song.

Championships and accomplishments
All Japan Women's Pro-Wrestling
AJW Championship (1 time)
AJW Tag Team Championship (3 times) – with Takako Inoue (2) and Rie Tamada (1)
Arsion
Queen of Arsion Championship (3 times)
Twin Star of Arsion Championship (2 times) – with Aja Kong (1) and Lioness Asuka (1)
Zion '98
BattlARTS
King And Queens Tournament (2000) – with Alexander Otsuka and Yumi Fukawa
Cauliflower Alley Club
Future Legend Award (2006)
ChickFight
ChickFight II
ChickFight III
Consejo Mundial de Lucha Libre
CMLL World Women's Championship (1 time)

References

1970 births
20th-century professional wrestlers
21st-century professional wrestlers
Japanese female professional wrestlers
Living people
Sportspeople from Hiroshima Prefecture
CMLL World Women's Champions